The Game Tour was the eighth headlining concert tour by the British rock band Queen to support their successful 1980 album The Game. This tour featured the first performances in South America by the group. This tour marked the last time Queen played without a fifth player, as all tours from 1982 onwards would feature an extra man playing on keyboard.

Background 
This tour marked the introduction of a new lighting rig for Queen; the "Fly Swatters", also referred to as the "Bic Razors". This is also the first tour where Freddie Mercury had his moustache grown out. He would often ask the audience what they thought, to a mixed reception, where he would often pledge to keep it. Several songs from the new album were incorporated, such as "Play the Game", "Need Your Loving Tonight", and "Rock It". The latter two of which saw very few performances on this leg of the tour, with Rock It being dropped before the four Inglewood dates, and Need Your Loving Tonight being dropped in the middle of August. Both songs would return to the stage in one form or another. Notably, "Somebody to Love" was only performed rarely early in the tour, being practically absent in the first three legs, but would return as a staple to the set by early March in South America.

At one of the concerts in Inglewood, Michael Jackson recommended that the band release Another One Bites the Dust as a single, which they did. Believing it not to be single material, the song became a large success for the band, particularly in North America. The Hartford concert in August marks the first known time the song was played live. Dragon Attack was added to the set in Providence later that same month. You're My Best Friend, a successful single for the band, saw its last performance on the last night of the North American leg, at the Madison Square Garden.

At the start of the European leg of the tour, the Battle Theme from the Flash Gordon soundtrack was incorporated into the set. Need Your Loving Tonight was also reincorporated into the set after a lengthy absence, now coming after "Get Down, Make Love". The concert in Essen featured the first performance of "The Hero" from the Flash Gordon soundtrack, with the second night in Birmingham being the debut of "Flash's Theme".

Due to the murder of John Lennon on the 8th of December, the members of Queen created an arrangement of Lennon's greatest hit, "Imagine", which was played on a handful of dates, including the night after Lennon's death, and on the final night of the leg. Whenever the cover was performed, "Keep Yourself Alive" was dropped. "Need Your Loving Tonight" and "Jailhouse Rock" were also dropped on the 9th.

On the Japanese leg of the tour, Vultan's Theme was added to the setlist on February 13, staying as part of the set until the end of the leg.

Queen was encouraged to play in South America, after discovering that they were extremely popular. In Buenos Aires, Queen drew a crowd of 300,000—the largest single concert crowd in Argentine history . In São Paulo, Brazil, the attendance was 131,000 and 120,000 on two consecutive nights. All three Buenos Aires shows were filmed and broadcast, however, only the second night has its footage completely available. A fragment of the first night's footage and a screenshot of the third night's are all that are known to exist. The first São Paulo show was also broadcast and is widely available, however, the second night only circulates via a low quality broadcast, and a poor-quality bootleg.

This was the only tour that Queen played in Venezuela, where they were due to play 5 shows in its capital city, Caracas. However, after their third performance on 27 September, the Venezuelan government declared an 8-day period of National Mourning due to the passing of one of Venezuela's former president. The remaining two concerts were cancelled and all tickets were refunded to more than 50,000 fans. The third night was filmed and was eventually leaked.

Queen were due to play two nights in Monterrey and Guadalajara each, however, due to subpart treatment of the crew by locals during the first night in Monterrey, Queen cancelled the remaining three shows. Two nights in Puebla were quickly set up as replacements, where the band faced unruly crowds that often threw shoes at the band.

We Will Rock You/Queen Rock Montreal 
In 1980, director Saul Swimmer approached Queen with the idea of producing a concert film. Initially proposed to be shot at the Madison Square Garden, the band moved shooting to the Montreal Forum in Canada due to the audience being louder than the monitors there.  When filming was occurring, Saul Swimmer wanted the band to choreograph their act and wear the same costumes on both nights, so he could switch between the footage at will. Out of spite, Jailhouse Rock was performed on the first night, with Mercury still in his trousers, which he wore during the first encore. During the second night, not only was the Elvis cover not performed, but Freddie had also switched to shorts for the first encore, to deliberately mess with the continuity of the footage.

Somehow, Swimmer acquired the rights to the footage. Many overdubs were made to the footage, such as most of Another One Bites the Dust, Sheer Heart Attack, Jailhouse Rock, the rock section of Bohemian Rhapsody, and the first verse of Let Me Entertain You. The footage was given a dry mix and released in 1982 as "We Will Rock You" by Mobilevision.

The film was released many times, including in 1984, 1997, and 2001, before the rights to the film were bought back by Queen Productions in early 2007. As all the footage that had not been included in the final cut had been discarded, the band could not re-edit the film, and could only remaster the video and remix the audio. Nonetheless, the intro sequence of Now I'm Here was recreated. Additionally, Love of My Life had an audience overdubbed onto it, and several fixes were made via pitch correction. Because of this, a good portion of the overdubs was removed. The footage was re-released properly in 2007 as "Queen Rock Montreal", and has received much critical acclaim since.

Setlist

Average setlist
This setlist is representative of the performance on 30 September 1980 in New York City, United States. It does not represent all the setlists for the duration of the tour.
"Intro"
"Jailhouse Rock"
"We Will Rock You (Fast)"
"Let Me Entertain You"
"Play The Game"
"Mustapha"
"Death On Two Legs"
"Killer Queen" 
"I'm In Love With My Car"
"Get Down, Make Love"
"You're My Best Friend"
"Save Me" 
"Now I'm Here"
"Dragon Attack"
"Now I'm Here (Reprise)"
"Fat Bottomed Girls"
"Love Of My Life"
"Keep Yourself Alive"
"Drum Solo"
"Guitar Solo"
"Brighton Rock (Reprise)"
"Crazy Little Thing Called Love"
"Bohemian Rhapsody"
"Tie Your Mother Down"Encore
"Another One Bites The Dust"
"Sheer Heart Attack"Encore
"We Will Rock You"
"We Are the Champions"
"God Save the Queen"

Selected setlists

Tour dates

Cancelled concerts

Tour band
Freddie Mercury – lead vocals, piano, guitar ("Crazy Little Thing Called Love"), tambourine.
Brian May – guitar, backing vocals, piano.
Roger Taylor – drums, timpani, lead vocals ("I'm in Love With My Car"), backing vocals.
John Deacon – bass guitar, additional vocals

Notes

References

External links
Queen Concerts
Queen Live: 1980–1982

1980 concert tours
1981 concert tours
Queen (band) concert tours